Seyf Khanlu (also Romanized as Seyf Khānlū; also known as Şafī Khānlū-ye ‘Olyā) is a village in Aslan Duz Rural District, Aslan Duz District, Parsabad County, Ardabil Province, Iran. At the 2006 census, its population was 106, in 23 families.

References 

Towns and villages in Parsabad County